Petrašiūnai is a neighborhood in the eastern part of the Lithuanian city of Kaunas. Part of larger Petrašiūnai elderate which also consists with Amaliai, Palemonas and Naujasodis neighorhoods. In 2006 it occupied about 28.46 km², with a population of about 18,000. Parts of elderate is on Kaunas Reservoir Regional Park.

Its eponymous estate was established in the 18th century, and it was the center of a volost. In 1946 it was incorporated into the city. After the Kaunas Hydroelectric Power Plant was built in 1960, it grew rapidly and became one of the city's industrial centers. The elderate borders Kaunas Reservoir and includes Pažaislis monastery ensemble.

The elderate contains the Petrašiūnai cemetery, where many distinguished Lithuanian political and social activists are buried.

References

External links

City of Kaunas - Petrašiūnai Elderate
Website of Kaunas city

Neighbourhoods of Kaunas